Eisenhuth Horseless Vehicle Company was a manufacturer of Brass Age automobiles who were originally based in New York City. In 1902 the company purchased the Keating Wheel and Automobile Company and established manufacturing operations in Middletown, Connecticut.  During 1903, the company merged with the Graham Fox Motor Car Company, absorbing that firm and expanding operations in Middletown.

In 1904, the company was sued by Colonel Frank A. Fox of the Graham Fox Motor Car Company, who claimed that he had "invented certain essential features of the motors now being made by the Eisenhuth company," and went bankrupt in 1907.  In 1909, the Eisenhuth factory was sold to the "Noiseless Typewriter Company."

Their automobile was an unusual model called the Compound with three cylinders.  Two were working cylinders, the larger middle one further expanded the exhaust gases of the outer working cylinders, this concept received later the name: '5-Stroke engine'.

History

The 1904 Compound was a touring car model.  Equipped with a tonneau, it could seat 7 passengers and sold for $6000 to 8000.  The vertical-mounted straight-3, situated at the front of the car, produced 35 hp (26.1 kW).  A 3-speed sliding gear transmission was fitted.  The car weighed 3100 lb (1406 kg).

See also
 Brass Era car
 List of defunct United States automobile manufacturers

References

 Frank Leslie's Popular Monthly (January, 1904)
Patents ES0156621; ES433850; ES0249247; ES0230551, on related engine designs (see: Espacenet)

Veteran vehicles
Defunct motor vehicle manufacturers of the United States
Motor vehicle manufacturers based in New York (state)